The Merta Road–Rewari line or Merta Road–Phulera–Rewari line is a railway route on the North Western Railway zone of Indian Railways. This route plays an important role in rail transportation of Bikaner division, Ajmer division and Jaipur division of Rajasthan state and Gurugram division of Haryana state.

History
This line was opened in different phases during the construction period.

 The first phase, from Merta Road to Kuchaman City was opened on 13 March 1893.
 The second phase, from Kuchaman City to Phulera Junction which also called as Sambhar Salt Lake Branch line was opened on 20 December 1879.
 The third phase, from Phulera Junction to Narnaul was opened on 18 May 1905.
 The fourth phase, from Narnaul to Rewari Junction was opened on 1 March 1941.

Whereas, the first branch line between Merta Road to Merta City was opened on 18 January 1905, and the second branch line between Degana Junction and Ratangarh Junction was built by the both companies into three sections such as Degana Junction to Marwar Frontier under the Jodhpur State Railway was opened on 16 September 1909 and under the Bikaner State Railway the two sections which are Marwar Frontier to Sujangarh section was also opened on 16 September 1909 whereas the Sujangarh to Ratangarh Junction section was opened on 2 February 1910. Later the third branch line between Makrana and Parbatsar City was opened on 1 August 1928, and thereafter fourth branch line from Jaipur to Churu Junction which comes under the Jaipur State Railway section was opened in different phases during the construction period.

 The first phase, from Jaipur Junction to Ringas Junction was opened on 19 December 1916.
 The second phase, from Ringas Junction to Palsana was opened on 6 April 1918.
 The third phase, from Palsana to Sikar Junction was opened on 1 December 1922.
 The fourth phase, from Sikar Junction to Fatehpur Shekhawati was opened on 1943.
 The fifth phase, from Fatehpur Shekhawati to Churu Junction was opened on 1957.

After that, the conversion into  broad gauge was started in 1992-93 through into different section starting from the first section between Merta Road Junction to Phulera Junction was completed and opened on 1996, later the second section between Phulera Junction and Rewari Junction which is also called as Phulera–Rewari chord section line was opened on 15 January 2009.
 
Whereas, the Merta Road Junction–Merta City branch line was converted into  broad gauge and opened on 24 October 1994 with inaugurating the first Railbus in India as well as Asia also by Former Minister Nathuram Mirdha showing the green flag. and the Makrana Junction–Parbatsar City branch line was also converted to  broad gauge and opened on 1 June 2016. on the other side the Degana Junction–Ratangarh Junction branch line was also opened on 25 June 2010, and the Jaipur–Churu branch line was closed on 15 November 2015 for conversion into  broad gauge in different phases and reverse way.

 The first phase, from Churu Junction to Sikar Junction was opened on 9 December 2017.
 The second phase, from Sikar Junction to Ringas Junction was opened on 27 January 2019.
 The third phase, from Ringas Junction to Jaipur Junction was opened on 21 October 2019.

Electrification
Electrification was started on 15 March 2016, on the first main line section between Phulera and Rewari  which was completed on 2018. and the Ringas Jaipur branch line section which was approved on Rail Budget 2016-17 was also electrified in March 2021. whereas the remaining sections of this route is fully electrified.

Trains passing through this line

Main
 Malani Express
 Bilaspur–Bikaner Express
 Bikaner–Puri Express
 Anuvrat AC Superfast Express
 Barmer–Guwahati Express
 Bikaner–Guwahati Express
 Ranthambore Express
 Leelan Express
 Pratap Express
 Bhopal–Jodhpur Passenger
 Marudhar Express (via Faizabad)
 Marudhar Express (via Sultanpur)
 Marudhar Express (via Pratapgarh)
 Mandore Express
 Puri–Jodhpur Express
 Rajasthan Sampark Kranti Express
 Howrah–Jodhpur Express
 Jaipur–Jodhpur Intercity Express
 Visakhapatnam–Bhagat Ki Kothi Express
 Bhagat Ki Kothi–Mannargudi Weekly Express
 Indore–Bikaner Mahamana Express
 Chandigarh–Bandra Terminus Superfast Express
 Bandra Terminus–Delhi Sarai Rohilla Express
 Chetak Express
 Ajmer–Delhi Sarai Rohilla Jan Shatabdi Express

Branch
 Amrapur Aravali Express
 Sainik Express
 Kota–Hisar Express
 Salasar Express
 Bhagat Ki Kothi–Kamakhya Express
 Jodhpur–Delhi Sarai Rohilla Superfast Express
 Bandra Terminus–Hisar Superfast Express
 Bandra Terminus–Jammu Tawi Vivek Express

References

5 ft 6 in gauge railways in India
Jodhpur railway division
Jaipur railway division
Bikaner railway division
Rail transport in Rajasthan
Rail transport in Haryana